The Liang dynasty, alternatively known as the Southern Liang in historiography, was an imperial dynasty of China and the third of the four Southern dynasties during the Northern and Southern dynasties period. It was preceded by the Southern Qi dynasty and succeeded by the Chen dynasty. The rump state of Western Liang existed until it was conquered in 587 by the Sui dynasty.

Rule 
During the Liang dynasty, in 547 a Persian embassy paid tribute to the Liang, amber was recorded as originating from Persia by the Book of Liang.

In 548, Hou Jing Prince of Henan started a rebellion with Xiao Zhengde the Prince of Linhe, nephew and a former heir of Emperor Wu of Liang and installed Xiao Zhengde as emperor. In 549, Hou sacked Jiankang, deposed and killed Xiao Zhengde, seized the power and put Emperor Wu effectively under house arrest. He dismissed the armies opposed to him in the name of Emperor Wu. In 550 Emperor Wu died, Hou created Emperor Wu's third son Crown Prince Gang Emperor Jianwen of Liang, also effectively under house arrest. He also attempted to suppress those who would not submit to him.

At the same time the Liang princes fought with each other rather than try to eliminate Hou: Emperor Wu's seventh son Xiao Yi Prince of Xiangdong killed his nephew Xiao Yu the Prince of Hedong, forcing Xiao Yu's younger brother Xiao Cha Prince of Yueyang to surrender to the Western Wei; Xiao Yi also attacked his sixth brother Xiao Guan Prince of Shaoling, forcing him to surrender to Northern Qi. Both Xiao Cha and Xiao Guan were created Prince of Liang. However, as Xiao Yi also allied with Northern Qi, Northern Qi gave up their support of Xiao Guan; Xiao Guan was defeated by Hou and finally killed by Western Wei. Xiao Ji the Prince of Wuling the youngest son of Emperor Wu claimed imperial title.

In 551, Hou forced Emperor Jianwen to abdicate to his grandnephew Xiao Dong the Prince of Yuzhang, then killed Emperor Jianwen and forced Xiao Dong to abdicate to him. Hou established a new dynasty named Han. In 552, Xiao Yi destroyed Han and claimed the imperial title as Emperor Yuan of Liang. He also ordered his subordinates to kill Xiao Dong and Xiao Dong's younger brothers. He created his headquarter Jiangling capital instead of returning to Jiankang. He also managed to eliminate Xiao Ji, but in order to do this he allied with Western Wei, who in turn conquered Yi Province (Sichuan).

In 553, Northern Qi attacked Liang, aiming to install a nephew of Emperor Wu, Xiao Tui the Marquess of Xiangyin, as emperor, but was defeated.

As the relationship between Emperor Yuan and Western Wei was deteriorating, in 555, Western Wei army sacked Jiangling, forcing Emperor Yuan to surrender, and killed Emperor Yuan as well as his sons before installing Xiao Cha as emperor of (Western) Liang at Jiangling.

Liang generals led by Wang Sengbian declared Xiao Fangzhi Prince of Jin'an, the only living son of Emperor Yuan, as Prince of Liang at Jiankang, aiming to crown him the new emperor, but the Northern Qi army defeated them, forcing them into an agreement to recognise a nephew of Emperor Wu, Xiao Yuanming the Marquess of Zhenyang, as emperor instead. Wang requested that Xiao Fangzhi be created Crown Prince and Xiao Yuanming agreed. General Chen Baxian launched a raid that killed Wang in favor of Xiao Fangzhi while denouncing Wang for surrendering to Northern Qi. Xiao Yuanming was forced to abdicate to Xiao Fangzhi, who was known as Emperor Jing of Liang, and Chen seized power. He initially claimed Liang a subject of Northern Qi but later defeated the army of Northern Qi.

In 557, Chen Baxian established the new powerful Chen dynasty. Liang general Wang Lin also claimed Xiao Zhuang Prince of Yongjia grandson of Emperor Yuan emperor. In 560, the Chen dynasty defeated Xiao Zhuang who fled to the Northern Qi and was created Prince of Liang in 570. The small and weak Western Liang state existed until 587 when Sui dynasty destroyed it.

In 617, Xiao Xian from Western Liang imperial clan claimed himself Liang Emperor in light of the disturbance in the end of Sui dynasty. His realm was destroyed by Tang dynasty in 621.

Portraits of Periodical Offering of Liang 

The Portraits of Periodical Offering of Liang by the Emperor Yuan of Liang, Xiao Yi, dated to the 6th century, is the earliest surviving of these specially significant paintings. They reflect foreign embassies that took place, particularly regarding the three Hephthalite (Hua) ambassadors, in 516–520 CE. The original of the work was lost, and the only surviving edition of this work was a copy from the Song dynasty in the 11th century, and is currently preserved at the National Museum of China. The original work consisted of at least twenty five portraits of ambassadors from their respectively country. The copy from the Song dynasty has twelve portraits and descriptions of thirteen envoys, with the envoy from Dangchang missing a portrait.

The envoys from right to left were: the Hephthalites (滑/嚈哒), Persia (波斯), Korea (百濟), Kucha (龜茲), Japan (倭), Malaysia (狼牙脩), Qiang (鄧至), Yarkand (周古柯), Kabadiyan (呵跋檀), Kumedh (胡蜜丹), Balkh (白題), and Mohe (末).

Artistic heritage
Tombs of a number of members of the ruling Xiao family, with their sculptural ensembles, in various states of preservation, are located near Nanjing.
The best surviving example of the Liang dynasty's monumental statuary is perhaps the ensemble of the Tomb of Xiao Xiu  (475–518), a brother of Emperor Wu, located in Qixia District east of Nanjing.

Emperors

Rulers' family tree

See also 

King of Liang
 Chen dynasty
 Book of Liang
 History of Northern Dynasties
 History of Southern Dynasties
 Zizhi Tongjian

Notes

References

External links 
 

 
States and territories established in the 500s
States and territories disestablished in the 550s
557 disestablishments
Dynasties in Chinese history
Former countries in Chinese history
502 establishments
6th-century establishments in China
6th-century disestablishments in China